Median Snowfield is a large snowfield in the Pensacola Mountains of Antarctica, between the Torbert Escarpment, in the Neptune Range, and the southern part of the Forrestal Range. It was mapped by the United States Geological Survey from surveys and U.S. Navy air photos, 1956–66, and was named by the Advisory Committee on Antarctic Names reflect its position between the Neptune and Forrestal Ranges.

References

Snow fields of Antarctica
Bodies of ice of Queen Elizabeth Land